The 2003 Fordham Rams football team was an American football team that represented Fordham University during the 2003 NCAA Division I-AA football season. A year after winning the conference championship, Fordham tied for third in the Patriot League. 

In their fifth and final year under head coach Dave Clawson, the Rams compiled a 9–3 record. Kevin Eakin, Colby Khuns, Dan McGrath and Kirwin Watson were the team captains. 

The Rams outscored opponents 386 to 251. Their 4–3 conference record tied for third out of eight in the Patriot League standings. 

The Rams were ranked No. 13 in the preseason Division I-AA national poll, and moved up and down in the rankings during the year, reaching as high as No. 9 and dropping to No. 25 on two occasions, including the final week of the season. After that last game, Fordham dropped farther and finished the year unranked. 

Fordham played its home games at Jack Coffey Field on the university's Rose Hill campus in The Bronx, in New York City.

Schedule

References

Fordham
Fordham Rams football seasons
Fordham Rams football